The offering in Christianity is a gift of money to the Church which is not considered a Christian's payment of his/her tithes.

In general, the offering is differentiated from the tithe as being 1) amounts given by members for general purposes over and above what would constitute a tithe, 2) amounts given for specific purposes (e.g. mission work, building program, alms for the poor) and/or 3) amounts given by non-members regardless of amount.

In some Christian services, there is a part reserved for the collection of donations that is referred to as the offertory.  Historically, the offertory takes place either in the middle of the service (or at the end) and is collected by passing a collection plate (which may be fancy, or simple).  Other churches collect donations by placing a collection box reserved for that purpose (usually near the exit doors).  More recently, donations are collected by electronic means, either as one-time or recurring items (New Zealand based firm Pushpay is a leader in this field).

History

Origin 
In the Bible, the offering is an act of gratitude to God. At the time of Moses, God gave certain prescriptions to the people of Israel. In particular, he was to bring him some of his wealth by way of gratitude for the land that God gave him for inheritance. The offerings were largely agricultural products: wheat, barley, oil, animals and the amount was one-tenth of their income, the tithe.

New Alliance 
In the New Testament, especially in the Epistle to the Galatians in chapter 6, Paul of Tarsus reminds the believers' commitment to their pastor and the poor. In this same book, the offering is compared to a seed. These concepts are echoed in the Second Epistle to the Corinthians chapter 9. The motivation of the donor is no longer an obligation, but must be a free choice of generosity. Paul of Tarsus has made several collections in order to help people in need. Moreover, the offering is presented as a support for the mission and a sign of compassion for the poor.

21st century 
Offering through the Internet has become a common practice in many evangelical churches.

Using
The offering is put at the service of the Church, for example for the support of the ministers of God, Pastors and missionaries, building maintenance costs, programs, helping the underprivileged (Christian humanitarian aid). For the affiliated churches, the offering also supports the services of their denomination(such as missionary organizations, schools and theological institutes). According to a 2014 survey of 1,605 churches in the United States by Christianity Today, the top five expenditures are staff salaries (ministers) to 47%, the ministries and the support (Christian humanitarian aid) to 9%, the place of worship (mortgage or rent of the building to 7%, utilities to 7%, maintenance to 5%), the support for international missions at 5% and support for local missions at 4%. A 2016 study conducted by the Leadership Network and the Vanderbloemen Search Group among 1,252 churches in the United States, in Canada, in South Africa and in Great Britain, gave similar figures.

In 1948, the evangelist Billy Graham and his evangelistic team established the Modesto Manifesto, a code of ethics life and work to protect against accusations of financial, sexual and power abuse.  This code includes rules for collecting offerings in churches, working only with churches supportive of cooperative evangelism, using official crowd estimates at outdoor events, and a commitment to never be alone with a woman other than his wife, unless another person is present.

See also
Church service
Church attendance
Christian liturgy
Worship service (evangelicalism)

References

Christian worship and liturgy